The Messina tramway is a tramway forming part of the public transport system in Messina, a city and comune in the region of Sicily, Italy.

History
Trams returned to Messina on 3 April 2003, after a long gestation and construction period.  Messina's earlier urban tramway network had been disposed of more than half a century earlier, following the closure of its last line in 1951.

The new tramway line replaced the former bus line no 28.

The southern terminus of the new tramway, at Gazzi, was activated later; initially, the tram stop at Bonino marked the southern end of the line.

Rolling stock
The tram service is provided by 15 modern 5-section Alstom Cityway articulated trams.

See also
Messina Centrale railway station
List of town tramway systems in Italy
History of rail transport in Italy
Rail transport in Italy

References

External links

 Associazione Ferrovie Siciliane - AFS (Messina), Rail and maritime transport, modelling, culture, ...  (amateur's site)
 
 
 Messina tram at public-transport.net

This article is based upon a translation of the Italian language version as at March 2011.

Messina
Messina
Railway lines in Sicily
Messina